Mukhrani may refer to:
Mukhrani (village), a village in Georgia
Mukhrani, a former princedom in Georgia
House of Mukhrani, a Georgian princely family, branch of the Bagrationi dynasty